Tragocephala berchmansi is a species of beetle in the family Cerambycidae. It was described by Hintz in 1909.

Varietas
 Tragocephala berchmansi var. postmaculata Breuning, 1954
 Tragocephala berchmansi var. conjunctevittata Breuning, 1954

References

berchmansi
Beetles described in 1909